Broady is an English surname. Notable people with the surname include:

Brandon Broady (born 1986), American actor
Earl Broady (1904–1992), American judge, attorney, police officer and pianist
Eloise Broady DeJoria (born 1957), American business owner, actress, producer, and philanthropist
Liam Broady (born 1994), British tennis player, brother of Naomi
Naomi Broady (born 1990), British tennis player, sister of Liam
Oscar Broady (1832–1922), Swedish petty officer and American brigade commander

See also 
Broady Valley

English-language surnames